Hasankhandan (also Romanized as Hasankhandān) is a village in Deh Bakri Rural District, in the Central District of Bam County, Kerman Province, Iran. At the 2016 census, its population was 20, in 8 families.

References 

Populated places in Bam County